The 2013 Vanier Cup, the 49th edition of the Canadian university football championship, took place on Saturday, November 23, 2013 at TELUS-Université Laval Stadium in Quebec City, Quebec. This was the third time in five years that Université Laval hosted the Vanier Cup. For the previous two years, the game had been held in conjunction with the Canadian Football League's championship, the Grey Cup, but due to logistical issues by this year's host, Regina, a joint venture was not possible.

Game summary

Scoring summary 
First Quarter
LAV - Single Bede missed 30-yard field goal attempt (3:03)

Second Quarter
LAV - FG Bede 19 (7:56)
LAV - Team Safety (12:42)

Third Quarter
LAV - FG Bede 10 (4:16)
CGY - Harty 6 run (Mark converts) (7:59)
LAV - FG Bede 16 (12:39)
CGY - Dobko 6 pass from Buckley (Mark converts) (13:43)
LAV - FG Bede 36 (15:00)

Fourth Quarter
LAV - TD Lochard 8 run (Bede converts) (9:12)
LAV - FG Bede 12 (14:03)

References

External links
 Official website

Vanier Cup
Vanier Cup
Vanier Cup
2013 in Quebec
2010s in Quebec City